Simone Philip Kamel, mononymously known as Simone, born June 14, is an Egyptian singer, that  throughout the 1990s was famous for her soprano voice. Her most famous songs include "" (Not Just a Look and a Smile), "" (Taxi), "" (Fear Me), "" (Happy), "" (Again, Again), "" (Thank You), "" (My Watch is not Set), "" (Casanova), "" (I'm Talking Seriously). She also released a Greek/Arabic song called Munawar for the Greek-Egyptian Friendship Festival.

Life and career

Early life and education 
Simone has a bachelor's degree in French literature from the Ain Shams University.

Beginning of musical career 
She participated in the Greek-Egyptian Friendship Festival where she sang a song in Greek.

Famous songs 
 "" (Not Just a Look and a Smile)
 "" (Taxi)
 "" (Fear Me)
 "" (Happy)
 "" (Again, Again)
 "" (Thank You)
 "" (My Watch is not Set)
 "" (Casanova)
 "" (I'm Talking Seriously)

Movies 
  (A Bitter Day and a Sweet Day) (1988)
  (The Home Invaders) (1992)
  (Ice Cream in Glym) (1992)
  (Suspect) (1992)
  (Fazaa''') (2015)

 TV series 
  (Zizinia) (1997)
  (A Knight Without a Horse) (2002)
  (It Happened in the Pyramid) (2004)
  (Red Sulfur) (2017)
  (Red Sulfur 2)
  (Chains of Fire) (2007)
  (Black and White)
  (The Era of the Knights)
  (The Southern Dream) (1995)
  (The Family of Shams)
  ('Bin El Sarayat') (2015)

 Plays 
  (The Lady's Game) (2001)
  (Carmen) (1999)
  (The Road of Peace) (2000)
  (Siam Siam'')

References

External links
Elfann.com
Lahamag.com
Elaph.com
Elaph.com
 

20th-century Egyptian women singers
1966 births
Living people
Singers from Cairo
Ain Shams University alumni